A Will of Her Own is a 1915 British silent drama film directed by Maurice Elvey and starring Elisabeth Risdon, Fred Groves and Hilda Sims.

Premise
A woman marries a doctor, but leaves him to pursue a career on the stage. Eventually they are reunited.

Cast
 Elisabeth Risdon as Isabel Stanton 
 Fred Groves as Dr. Blake 
 Hilda Sims  
 Ernest A. Cox  
 Dolly Tree

References

Bibliography
 Murphy, Robert. Directors in British and Irish Cinema: A Reference Companion. British Film Institute, 2006.

External links
 

1915 films
British drama films
British silent feature films
1910s English-language films
Films directed by Maurice Elvey
1915 drama films
British black-and-white films
1910s British films
Silent drama films